Lutimaribacter pacificus is a bacterium from the genus of Lutimaribacter which has been isolated from the Pacific Ocean.

References 

Rhodobacteraceae
Bacteria described in 2009